David Schmidt (born 19 October 1993) is a German handball player for Frisch Auf Göppingen and the German national team.

He represented Germany at the 2020 European Men's Handball Championship.

References

External links

1993 births
Living people
German male handball players
Sportspeople from Karlsruhe
Handball-Bundesliga players
Bergischer HC players